Sir Thomas Sheridan, the elder (c. 1646 – 1712) was the Chief Secretary for Ireland between 1687 and 1688.

Early years

Sheridan was born in St. John's, County Meath, Ireland, the fourth son of Reverend Dennis Sheridan, rector of Killesher parish, County Fermanagh. His siblings included William Sheridan, Patrick Sheridan the Anglican bishop of Cloyne and Margery Sheridan, wife of Colonel Meredith Gwyllym of Ballyconnell.

College

Sheridan entered Trinity College, Dublin on 17 Jan. 1661 from where he was awarded a Bachelor of Arts degree in 1664, and in 1667 he was elected a Fellow of Trinity.

Career

Sheridan attended the Middle Temple in London from 29 June 1670 to study law but cut his studies short when he was appointed Cork Collector of Customs, where he made his fortune. In 1676 he was appointed a farmer of the Irish Revenue and sold his interest for a profit of £4,000. On 6 August 1677 Sheridan received an honorary degree of Doctor of Civil Law from the University of Oxford and on 6 February 1679 he was elected a Fellow of the Royal Society, London. He was imprisoned in 1680 for allegedly conspiring in the Popish Plot and on 15 December 1680 he gave evidence before the House of Commons but, as Parliament was dissolved shortly afterwards, was set free.

Chief Secretary for Ireland

King James II of England appointed Thomas Sheridan as Chief Secretary for Ireland in 1687 but he was accused of corruption by the Lord Lieutenant of Ireland, Richard Talbot, 1st Earl of Tyrconnell and was removed from the post in 1688.

Later Career and Death

When James II of England was deposed, Sheridan's political career was finished and he spent his remaining days in France attending the court of James II. He authored the following works-

1. Mr. Sheridan's Speech after his Examination before the late House of Commons (London, 1681)

2. A Discourse on the Rise and Power of Parliaments (1677)

3. The Sheridan Papers (1702), (contained in Calendar of the Stuart papers)

and he also translated A Survey of Princes by Jean-Louis Guez de Balzac

Sheridan died at Château de Saint-Germain-en-Laye, Paris, France in 1712.

Family

About June 1684 Sheridan married Helen Ravenscroft (née Appleby), widow of George Ravenscroft, the developer of English lead crystal, and the daughter of Thomas Appleby and Helen Gascoigne of Linton-on-Ouse in Yorkshire. There were three children of the marriage- Therese Helen, Mary and Sir Thomas Sheridan junior who became tutor to Prince Charles Edward Stuart.

References

1640s births
1712 deaths
Alumni of Trinity College Dublin
Members of the Middle Temple
Irish knights
17th-century Irish people
Irish Jacobites
Chief Secretaries for Ireland
Fellows of the Royal Society